Charlotte McKane (born May 7, 1995) is an American college student known for community service work. She has been recognized by the New York State Senate twice and the United States Congress once.

Charlotte's Circle
Charlotte's Circle is a service learning project that helps several organizations in the local community. This ongoing project has raised over $70,000 to date in funds to help local organizations. The project currently serves Family Service Association, Opportunities for Otsego's Violence Intervention Program and Catholic Charities of Delaware and Otsego Counties. In the past, the project also served the A. O. Fox Hospital Memorial Hospital's Psychiatric Ward until it closed in 2006.

McKane gives presentations about her project, poverty, and activism to clubs and organizations. She has also run workshops and been part of panel discussions at Hartwick College and SUNY Oneonta concerning activism and volunteerism.

In January 2013, a transition process was started to transfer the project to two families with small children so that the project can continue after McKane leaves the area to go to college. The transition process will be complete by June 2013.

Recognition

Prudential Spirit of Community Award
Charlotte McKane was named one of New York state's top two youth volunteers for 2009, receiving the Prudential Spirit of Community Award, as part of a nationwide program honoring young people for outstanding acts of volunteerism. Prudential Financial, in partnership with the National Association of Secondary School Principals (NASSP), administered the 14th annual award on February 10, 2009. McKane received a $1,000 award, an engraved medallion and an all expenses paid trip to Washington DC. The award winners were honored by former First Lady Laura Bush at a ceremony at the Smithsonian National Museum of Natural History.

New York State Senate
Charlotte McKane was recognized by New York Senator James L. Seward (New York) on March 23, 2009 for receiving the 2009 Prudential Spirit of Community Award. Seward praised her for raising funds to support Catholic Charities, Opportunities for Otsego’s Violence Intervention Program, the Family Service Association, and similar charities organizations.

Build-a-Bear Huggable Heroes Award
McKane was also one of twelve citizens nationwide to be selected for the 2006 Build-A-Bear Huggable Heroes award, a national community service award whose winners are featured in a calendar. It was created to reward kids for their outstanding acts of generosity and volunteerism and encourage other kids to do the same.

Trailblazer Award
On April 16, 2013, McKane received the Trailblazer Award from the City of Oneonta, New York. The Trailblazer Award is presented to a woman in the Oneonta area who, by demonstrating outstanding achievement in her field or in the community, has enhanced the visibility and stature of women. The winners are chosen by the city Commission on Community Relations and Human Rights. A special exception was made and there were two awards given in 2013: one to McKane who was recognized in the Young Leader and Community Service category, and the other to Sarah Patterson in the Career and Community Achievement category. McKane is the youngest woman to ever receive the award.

Others
 Catholic Charities Volunteer of the Year Award
 Angels in Action Award
 Kohl's 2005 Kids Who Care Award

Personal life

McKane was the Oneonta representative at the 2012 Empire Girls State run by the American Legion Auxiliary held at SUNY Brockport and was elected to the office of governor. She is the only Empire Girls State Governor to ever come from Otsego County.

References

External links
Charlotte's Circle

1995 births
People from Cooperstown, New York
Living people
People from Oneonta, New York
State University of New York at Oneonta alumni